William Parkinson Ruxton (1766 – 11 October 1847) of Red House in County Louth was an Irish Member of Parliament.

Ruxton was the son of Charles Ruxton by his wife Elizabeth, daughter of Robert Parkinson of Red House. He inherited the Red House and rebuilt it in its present form. He was elected to the Irish House of Commons for Ardee in 1790 and then again in 1799, sitting until the Parliament of Ireland was abolished by the Act of Union 1800. He was appointed High Sheriff of Louth for 1819–20.

Personal life
On 18 January 1802 he married Anna Maria Fortescue (born 6 July 1773 – died 25 August 1865), daughter of Thomas Fortescue of Dromisken. They had no children and she inherited Red House at his death. She died in 1865 and the estate passed to her nephew, Chichester Fortescue, who adopted the surname Parkinson-Fortescue.

Arms

References

Links
 , leighrayment.com; accessed 3 June 2016.

1766 births
1847 deaths
Politicians from County Louth
Irish MPs 1790–1797
Irish MPs 1798–1800
High Sheriffs of County Louth
Members of the Parliament of Ireland (pre-1801) for County Louth constituencies